Pearce is a suburb in the Canberra, Australia district of Woden. The postcode is 2607.  It was named after the longest-serving Senator and longest-serving Minister in Australia's federal history, Sir George Pearce.

Pearce adjoins the suburbs of Torrens, Mawson and Chifley. It is bordered by Beasley St to the south, Melrose and Athllon drives to the east and the Mount Taylor nature reserve to the west; a green corridor forms the northern border with Chifley. Located in the suburb are Marist College, Melrose High School and Sacred Heart Primary School, a shopping centre and a neighbourhood oval.

Geology

Deakin Volcanics green-grey and purple rhyodacite is in the northern half and under Quaternary alluvium in the south.  In the upper parts of the suburb are two patches of Deakin Volcanics green grey, purple and cream rhyolite.  Further up Mount Taylor are Deakin Volcanics red-purple and green grey rhyodacite and porphyry.

References

Suburbs of Canberra